Mataka is a surname. Notable people with the surname include:

 Bwana Mataka -  ruler of Siu (or Siyu) husband of Swahili poet Mwana Kupona
 Elizabeth Mataka - former United Nations Special Envoy for HIV/AIDS in Africa
 Michael Mataka - Zambian police commissioner and former actor
 Willie Mataka - Australian professional rugby league player 

Bantu-language surnames